Frederick Henry Grubb (27 May 1887 – 6 March 1949) was a British road racing cyclist who competed in the 1912 Summer Olympics. He won silver medals in the individual road race and the team road race. In 1914, after he retired from racing, he established a bicycle manufacturing business (F.H.Grubb) in Brixton, London. By 1920 manufacturing had moved to Croydon and then in 1926 to Twickenham. In 1935 FHG Ltd was established in Wimbledon but by 1947 the F H Grubb name was back in use. Two years after his death the business was bought by Holdsworth, which used the Freddie Grubb brand until around 1978.

Cycling career

Born in Kingston, Surrey in 1887, Freddie Grubb was a leading rider when cycle-racing in Britain was limited to time-trials and track racing. A writer said of him in 1910: "Since August Bank Holiday he has been the most talked-of cyclist in Great Britain... and it is safe to say that no man since Harry Green has shown more brilliant promise". Grubb was teetotal and a vegetarian. He rode for the Vegetarian Cycle and Athletic Club. He broke the 100-mile time-trial record in 1910 on a fixed-wheel bike with no brakes. The Vegetarian club historian, Peter Duncan, said: "He has no brakes; traffic was so light he saw no need for them."  Grubb rode the distance in less than five hours. The distance had already been ridden in less than five hours by "Goss" Green during a record attempt from London to Brighton and back over 104 miles; his finishing time showed he had ridden 100 miles in less than five hours but he was denied the 100-mile record because he had not been timed at that distance. Grubb's ride was the first to be formally timed.

Grubb set a record for 12 hours in the Anerley event near Liverpool in 1911. The organizers had set a course of 210 miles, further than they expected any rider to go. It had to be extended to allow Grubb to ride 220.5 miles. The second rider, Charlie Davey, also beat the club's plans and finished in 215.5 miles.

Grubb set a record of 351 miles for a 24-hour time-trial on the track. It was broken by Henrik Morén with 375.6 miles in 1912. Grubb's 5h 9m 41s for London to Brighton and back stood for 14 years. He rode a Triumph bicycle with a reinforced frame to withstand his style of forcing round big gears.

He won two silver medals in the Olympic Games in Stockholm in 1912. He turned professional in 1914. Cycling reported:

Grubb was considered for the New York, Paris and Berlin six-day races. He rode briefly on the continent, starting in the 1914 Giro d'Italia before returning disillusioned. The venture ended his cycling because rules denied professionals the right to ride again as an amateur.

Cycle trade
Grubb opened a cycle business in Brixton, south London, in 1914 but the First World War started. Peter Duncan said:

Grubb opened another shop after the war, with money from his clubmate Charlie Davey. Grubb went into partnership with Ching Allin in 1919, forming Allin & Grubb of 132 Whitehorse Road, Croydon. The two split in a row over cycle design. Allin & Grubb became A. H. Allin and began selling Davey cycles rather than Grubb.

The cycle-trade historian Mick Butler, who called Grubb "not a very likable character", said:

Butler added:

Grubb opened another business under his own name in London Road, West Croydon, in 1920 and by 1924 had a shop at Robsart Street, Brixton.

In 1934 Grubb advertised that his business was in liquidation. He then opened another company, FHG, at 147a Haydons Road, Wimbledon, with 20 staff from the former venture.

Grubb died on 6 March 1949, aged 61, in north-east Surrey and his family continued the business. The Holdsworth company bought the Grubb name in 1952.

Notes

References

External links

Nkilgariff Archive Site – W.F.Holdsworth, FH Grubb, Claud Butler

1887 births
1949 deaths
English male cyclists
Cyclists at the 1912 Summer Olympics
Olympic cyclists of Great Britain
Olympic silver medallists for Great Britain
Companies based in the London Borough of Merton
Olympic medalists in cycling
Defunct cycle manufacturers of the United Kingdom
People from Kingston upon Thames
Medalists at the 1912 Summer Olympics
Companies based in the London Borough of Lambeth